Baramati Lok Sabha constituency is one of the 48 Lok Sabha (parliamentary) constituencies in Maharashtra state in western India.

Vidhan Sabha segments
Presently, Baramati Lok Sabha constituency comprises six Vidhan Sabha (legislative assembly) segments. These segments are:

Members of Lok Sabha

^ bypoll

Election results

General elections 2019

General elections 2014

General elections 2009

General elections 2004

General elections 1980
 Shankarrao Bajirao Patil (Cong - I) : 209,300 votes    
 Sambhajirao Kakade (Janta Party) : 123,432
 Mohan Dharia (Congress - Urs) : 94692

See also
 Pune district
 List of Constituencies of the Lok Sabha

Notes

External links
Baramati lok sabha  constituency election 2019 results details

Lok Sabha constituencies in Maharashtra
Politics of Pune district
Baramati